Pernilla Pettersson (born 12 January 1972) is a Swedish table tennis player. She competed in the women's doubles event at the 1996 Summer Olympics.

References

1972 births
Living people
Swedish female table tennis players
Olympic table tennis players of Sweden
Table tennis players at the 1996 Summer Olympics
Place of birth missing (living people)
20th-century Swedish women